Lake Oscar is a lake in Douglas County, in the U.S. state of Minnesota.

According to Warren Upham, Lake Oscar was probably named after Oscar I of Sweden.

See also
List of lakes in Minnesota

References

Lakes of Minnesota
Lakes of Douglas County, Minnesota